Okuniew  is a village in the administrative district of Gmina Halinów, within Mińsk County, Masovian Voivodeship, in east-central Poland.

The village has a population of 1,900.

References

External links
 Jewish Community in Okuniew on Virtual Shtetl

Villages in Mińsk County